Edward Carroll may refer to:

 Edward Gonzalez Carroll (1910–2000), American bishop of the United Methodist Church
 Edward Carroll (musician) (born 1953), American trumpeter
 Edward C. Carroll (1893–1969), American politician in the Massachusetts Senate